Loreto  is a municipality of the Mexican state of Baja California Sur. It was created in 1992 from the partition of the neighboring Comondú Municipality. The municipal seat is in the town of Loreto, which was the former capital of Las Californias during Spanish colonial times.

The 2010 census reported a population of 16,738, about 88 percent of whom lived in the town of Loreto. The municipality has an area of 4,311 km² (1,664.49 sq mi).

Demographics

Major communities

The largest localities (cities, towns, and villages) are:

Sister cities
   Ventura, California (United States)

See also
Alfredo Garcia Green, first municipal president of Loreto.

References

External links

Official Ayuntamiento de Loreto website (Municipality of Loreto)—
Enciclopedia de los Municipios de México: Baja California Sur— 

 
Municipalities of Baja California Sur